Fourteen ships of the French Navy or the Galley Corps (which was separate from the Navy) of the Ancien Régime or Empire have borne the name Couronne ("crown"):
 , the first major warship to be built in France – actually launched in 1632/33
 , a flûte or storeship (1664–1677)
 , a galley (1665–1675) built as Vendôme in 1663 but renamed Couronne in 1665
 , an 82-gun ship of the line (1669–1712)
  (1674), a 6-gun fire ship (1674–1677)
 , a galley (1677–1686)
 , a galley (1686–1696)
 , a galley (1697–1716)
 , a 74-gun ship of the line (1749–1795)
 , an 80-gun ship of the line (1768–1781)
 Couronne an 80-gun ship. Renamed Ça Ira in 1793, captured by Britain 1795. She was destroyed in an accidental fire in 1796.
 , a 32-gun frigate, bore the name Couronne while under construction as a 
 , a Téméraire-class 74-gun ship of the line (1813)
 , a Téméraire-class 80-gun ship of the line (1824–1869)
  (1861), an iron-hulled derivative of the 

French Navy ship names